Clear All Wires! is a 1933 American pre-Code comedy film directed by George Hill and written by Bella and Samuel Spewack (from their 1932 play of the same name) and Delmer Daves. The film stars Lee Tracy, Benita Hume, Una Merkel, James Gleason, Alan Edwards and Eugene Sigaloff. The film was released on February 24, 1933, by Metro-Goldwyn-Mayer.

Cast
Lee Tracy as Buckley Joyce Thomas
Benita Hume as Kate
Una Merkel as Dolly
James Gleason as Lefty
Alan Edwards as Pettingwaite
Eugene Sigaloff as Prince Alexander
Ari Kutai as Kostya
C. Henry Gordon as Commissar
Lya Lys as Eugenie
John Melvin Bleifer as Sozanoff
Lawrence Grant as MacKenzie

References

External links
 

1933 films
1933 comedy films
American black-and-white films
American comedy films
American films based on plays
Films about journalists
Films directed by George Hill
Films set in Moscow
Metro-Goldwyn-Mayer films
1930s English-language films
1930s American films